The School of Physical Sciences is an academic unit of the University of California, Irvine (UCI) that conducts academic research and teaching in the field of physical sciences. It offers both pre-professional training and general education in the departments of chemistry, earth system science, mathematics, and physics and astronomy. The school enrolls 1,400 undergraduate and graduate students and is one of the top schools in the nation in the number of degrees it confers in the area of physical sciences. It also offers specializations such as biochemistry, statistics, math for economics, applied and computational mathematics, astrophysics, applied physics, biomedical physics, and education.
In 1995, the school gained international prominence when Frank Sherwood Rowland, a professor in chemistry and Frederick Reines, a professor in physics, won the Nobel Prize in their respective fields. It was the first time two people won the prize in the same year in two different fields at the same public university.

History

The School of Physical Sciences was established in 1965, as one of the founding schools of the University of California, Irvine.

Departments
Physics and Astronomy
Mathematics
Chemistry
Earth System Science

Programs and degrees
There were 1208 Undergraduate students and 516 Graduate students as of Fall 2014.

Degrees conferred
All four departments confer Bachelor of Science, Master of Science, and Doctor of Philosophy degrees.

Undergraduate

The school possesses 5 undergraduate majors, each providing either a Bachelor of Science degree or a Bachelor of Arts degree. The majors that are available are chemistry, earth system science, environmental science, mathematics, and physics.

Graduate
The School of Physical Sciences provides 1 masters level graduate program in chemistry and 4 doctorate level graduate programs, including programs in chemistry, mathematics, physics and astronomy, and earth system science.

The Department of Chemistry offers Ph.D. degrees in all major sub-disciplines of chemistry, along with several interdisciplinary programs. These programs include analytical chemistry, atmospheric chemistry, chemical biology, inorganic chemistry, organic chemistry, physical chemistry, theoretical chemistry, chemicals and materials physics, and medicinal chemistry and pharmacology. As of fall 2014, there were about 40 faculty members, 240 graduate students, and 50 postdoctoral fellows in the chemistry program. There is also a master's degree program in chemistry offered, along with a master's degree program in chemistry with a teaching credential.

The Department of Mathematics offers a Ph.D. degree in mathematics as well as a master's degree in mathematics. As of fall 2014, there were about 36 faculty members and 100 graduate students.

The Department of Physics and Astronomy offers both Ph.D and master's degrees in physics, as well as an interdisciplinary degree in chemical and material physics.

The Department of Earth System Science offers a Ph.D. degree program in earth system science.

Associated bodies

Student organizations
The American Chemical Society Student Affiliates is the student-run Chemistry Club at UCI. It provides academic and career guidance to undergraduates, as well as opportunities to meet and interact with guests or professors from the field of Chemistry.

The Anteaters Mathematics Club is the student-run Mathematics Club at UCI. It provides weekly guest lectures from professors, graduate students, or others in the field of Mathematics. The Anteaters Math Club also provides a quarterly panel with Mathematics professionals for a Q&A with students.

The UCI Earth System Club is a student-run club based on Earth System Science. The club provides students with information regarding the Earth System Science major as well as networking opportunities.

The Society of Physics Students at UC Irvine is UCI's chapter of the Society of Physics Students. The club conducts and organizes events to help students develop interest in physics, as well as providing areas for study.

The Astronomy Club at UCI is a student-run club based on Astronomy. The club provides students with opportunities to meet other students interested in astronomy, and often utilizes the UCI Observatory as well as the grounds of Aldrich Park for stargazing.

Nobel faculty

Frank Sherwood Rowland
Frank Sherwood Rowland was one of the original professors for the University of California, Irvine and became the first Chairman of the Chemistry Department in August 1964. He retired from his Chairman position five years later, but by 1973 Rowland changed his research focus from radiochemistry to atmospheric chemistry. In 1995, atmospheric chemist Rowland, along with his colleague Mario Molina received the Nobel Prize in chemistry for predicting and then proving that the ozone layer was being depleted by chlorofluorocarbons, common compounds found in aerosol sprays of the time. He continued to research their chemical effects on the environment.

Frederick Reines
Dr. Frederick Reines (1918-1998) along with his colleague Clyde Cowan in 1956 developed a method to detect, and confirmed the existence of, the neutrino, one of the most elusive subatomic particles. When he became the founding Dean of Physical Sciences of the University of California, Irvine in 1966 he brought his research along with him. In 1974 Reines stepped down as Dean in order to focus on his research and teaching as a professor. Their discovery of the neutrino eventually led to Reines and his colleague receiving the 1995 Nobel Prize in Physics. As a faculty member for UCI he received the Distinguished Faculty Lecturer Award in 1979 and the Medal for Outstanding Research in 1985, predating his Nobel Prize.

Irwin Rose
Irwin Rose was a researcher within the School of Medicine but did extensive collaboration with the School of Physical Sciences. In 1997, Rose moved to the facilities in UCI while sharing a space with Ralph Bradshaw. Dr. Rose, along with colleagues at the Israel Institute of Technology discovered a major pathway in the body which proteins are regulated by degradation. Because ubiquitin is an important molecule that impacts cell growth and division, malfunctions or improper breakdowns of ubiquitin causes diseases such as cancer and cystic fibrosis. In 2004, Dr. Rose received a Nobel Prize in the field of Chemistry for his discoveries. Since then, he received the Nobel Laureate Parking Permit at UCI, which gives him free parking for a lifetime.

Other Notable Faculty

Chemistry
Don Blake
James Pitts
Bill Evans

Earth System Science
Ralph Cicerone

Mathematics
Karl Rubin

Physics
Gregory Benford
Liu Chen

References

External links

 

Physical Sciences
Science education in the United States
Science and technology in Greater Los Angeles
University subdivisions in California
Educational institutions established in 1965
1965 establishments in California